Swamp lily can refer to plants:

Some species of Crinum, including:
 Crinum americanum, Florida swamp-lily
 
 Crinum pedunculatum
 Lilium superbum
 Ottelia ovalifolia
 Zephyranthes candida, Peruvian swamp lily